Tijmen Wildeboer (born 13 December 2001) is a Dutch professional footballer who plays as a midfielder for Eerste Divisie club Almere City.

Club career
Wildeboer made his professional debut with Jong AZ in a 3–2 Eerste Divisie loss to Jong Ajax on 16 October 2020.

References

External links
 
 Career stats & Profile - Voetbal International

2001 births
Living people
Footballers from Haarlem
Dutch footballers
Netherlands youth international footballers
Association football forwards
Jong AZ players
Almere City FC players
Eerste Divisie players